David Griffith is an artist whose work has appeared in role-playing games.

Career
His Dungeons & Dragons work includes interior art for Frostburn (2004), Stormwrack (2005), Magic of Incarnum (2005), Complete Psionic (2006), Fiendish Codex II: Tyrants of the Nine Hells (2006), Fantastic Locations: The Frostfell Rift (2006), Magic Item Compendium (2007), Complete Champion (2007), Fortress of the Yuan-Ti (2007), Wizards Presents: Races and Classes (2008), the 4th edition Player's Handbook (2008), Dungeon Master's Guide (2008), and  Monster Manual (2008).

Griffith was one of the artists on Dungeons & Dragons 4th Edition For Dummies.

References

External links
 David Griffith's website
 

English artists
Living people
Place of birth missing (living people)
Role-playing game artists
Year of birth missing (living people)